is a Japanese track and field athlete. She competed in the women's javelin throw at the 1996 Summer Olympics.

References

1966 births
Living people
Sportspeople from Toyama Prefecture
Japanese female javelin throwers
Olympic female javelin throwers
Olympic athletes of Japan
Athletes (track and field) at the 1996 Summer Olympics
Asian Games competitors for Japan
Athletes (track and field) at the 1994 Asian Games
World Athletics Championships athletes for Japan
Japan Championships in Athletics winners
20th-century Japanese women